Salangsdalen is a river valley in Bardu Municipality in Troms og Finnmark county, Norway. The river Salangselva flows north through the valley. The valley ends in the middle of Bardu, near the town of Setermoen.

The European route E6 highway runs north and south through the valley. The Polar Park is located in Salangsdalen—it is known as the northernmost zoo in the world. The Salangsdalen Chapel is located in the southern part of the valley. Rohkunborri National Park lies just east of the valley.

References

External links
Polar Park

Bardu
Valleys of Troms og Finnmark